On 20 June 2003 Howard (Zvi; Tzvi) Goldstein, age 47, his wife Michal, and Goldstein's parents, Lorraine, 73, and Eugene, 73, Goldstein drove on Route 60 en route to a party in Jerusalem celebrating the wedding of Michal and Zvi Goldstein's son, David, which had taken place on the previous day. Two members of a Hamas cell waiting in ambush on the roadside opened fire with AK-47s, hitting all four occupants of the car. Eugene Goldstein took the steering wheel and to help his injured son drive the car away from the gunmen and drove eight miles for medical help before the car flipped over.<ref name=Dan>{{cite news|last1=Dan|first1=Uri|title=N.Y. Heros Sacrifice: Dying, He Drives Kin from Thugs|url=https://nypost.com/2003/06/21/n-y-heros-sacrifice-dying-he-drives-kin-from-thugs/|access-date=15 August 2015|publisher=New York Post|date=21 June 2003}}</ref>

Zvi Goldstein, a technical writer who had immigrated from the U.S. to Israel, died of his injuries. Michal Goldstein survived. Lorraine Goldstein survived, although a series of operations to repair her damaged jaw caused by a bullet left her with little motion in her mouth. Eugene Goldstein survived with "a bullet lodged near his heart from (the) ambush." The survivors were taken to Hadassah Medical Center.

Hamas

Hamas immediately claimed responsibility for the shooting attack. This claim, in 2003, was described by the Haaretz newspaper as "surprising," since, according to writer Amos Harel, before the attack, the "militant Islamic organization (Hamas) has almost completely avoided carrying out shootings in the West Bank, focusing instead on using suicide bombers, primarily within the Green Line.

On 21 June, the Israel Defense Forces killed Abdullah Qawasmeh, who was believed to be the senior Hamas commander in the Hebron area.

Immediate impact

The attack was also described as disruptive to the Road map for peace, an initiative involving United States Secretary of State Colin Powell, who was in Jerusalem at the time of the ambush. According to Ian Fisher of The New York Times'', the attack was interpreted "as a message to Mr. Powell, the Israelis and its Palestinian supporters that Hamas remains strong and very much active."

Lawsuit
In 2004 Lorraine and Eugene Goldstein, who live in Plainview, New York, sued the Arab Bank for laundering money used to fund Hamas terror attacks targeting Israelis, including the attack in which his son, Howard, was killed.

In 2006, the Goldsteins joined a group of 50 American victims of terrorism (survivors or relatives of people murdered by terrorists), suing three large international banks, Crédit Lyonnais, Arab Bank, and NatWest, alleging that all three banks were involved in channeling money to Hamas, which has been listed by the government of the United States as a terrorist organization since 1997. The Anti-Terrorism Act enables American victims of acts of terrorism that take place outside the United States can sue for damages in federal courts.

In August 2015, Arab Bank agreed to a confidential settlement with hundreds of American victims of terrorism, including the Goldsteins.

References

Terrorist incidents in Israel in 2003
Terrorist attacks attributed to Palestinian militant groups
June 2003 events in Asia
Hamas attacks
2003 murders in Israel